Mohammed Al-Husain  is a Saudi football goalkeeper who played for Saudi Arabia in the 1984 Asian Cup.

References
Stats

Living people
Saudi Arabian footballers
Olympic footballers of Saudi Arabia
Footballers at the 1984 Summer Olympics
1984 AFC Asian Cup players
Saudi Professional League players
AFC Asian Cup-winning players
1960 births
Association football goalkeepers